Straszyn Prędzieszyn is a non-operational railway station in Straszyn, Pomeranian Voivodeship, Poland.

Lines crossing the station

References 
Straszyn Prędzieszyn article at Polish stations database, URL accessed at 17 March 2006

Railway stations in Pomeranian Voivodeship
Disused railway stations in Pomeranian Voivodeship
Gdańsk County